Places:
 Gollapudi, Vijayawada
 Gollapudi, Gampalagudem
 Gollapudi, Parchur
 Gollapudi, Musunur

Persons:
 Gollapudi Maruti Rao

Others:
 Gollapudi Srinivas Award